François Hers (born in 1943 in Uccle, Brussels) is a Belgian photographer and artist. He has been living and working in France since 1968.

Biography 
The itinerary and works of this artist from the conceptual movement follow in the image of the education he received. His mother (Nelly Stutz-Anagnostopoulos 1921–1987) taught him, through stories about the doings of his family during the Greek War of Independence and the Second Hellenic Republic, that it is possible to influence history. His father (Joseph Hers, 1884–1965), who spent over thirty-three years in China before founding a family, inspired him to search for the genuine motors of history behind those commonly accepted. Their house, by the architect Henry van de Velde, in which he lived until age 21, was a privileged meeting place for personalities who came to inform his father on political, religious, diplomatic, economic issues in Asia, the Soviet Union and Africa, in the framework of his activities to promote and favour exchanges with these regions of the globe, founded on first-hand information.

As for his artistic education, François Hers read books and reviews, manifests and other founding texts on European art history from 1900 to 1940: exhaustive publications left by Henry van de Velde in their house built in 1927, the "Nouvelle Maison," and that has since become a historic monument.

After a brief passage in architecture, questioning himself about what he could bring to the history of modern art he admired so much, François Hers understood that it was not with a traditional career and means that he could concretize a lifelong ambition that would guide his entire body of work.

In 1963, according to his own words, François Hers decided to break out of the museum walls that blocked the prospects Dada had opened up and create a pattern of connections between society, its artists and their works that would be as contemporary as the works themselves. In his opinion, whatever the formal progress suggested by the avant-garde, such connections still build up without a conscious choice and remain within frames thought of during the Renaissance.

In the sixties and the seventies, François Hers used photography as a means to achieve Performances and to question possible patterns of the relationships artists may develop with society, as well as the ones between society members themselves and the forms of each person's most intimate expressions.

In 1972, in Paris, he took part in creating an author-photographer's cooperative named Viva. He was the instigator of a collective reportage called Families in France, qualified as historic thanks to the incisive portrait it presents of the upheavals in French society.

To nourish his work with an experience of the world, the status of the reporter he had acquired enabled him to travel and to plunge into situations that would not have been open to him as an artist. It also offered him the opportunity of experimenting an economy based on demand, and as such, in opposition with anonymous exchange models which in the field of the arts are typically the ones of an economy based on offer. If, he thought, this mode of anonymous exchange was indeed historically necessary, since the autonomy and the freedom of artists had now been acquired, like everyone else's, they may no longer remain alone in responding to the creative needs of their society in a political economy of art that, furthermore, no longer responded to the demands of a democracy.

He held exhibitions in various museums and art centres. In 1980, at the Paris Biennale, he presented a series that revolutionized the art of the nude. He published, in 1982, in the daily newspaper Libération, a picture a day for five weeks, in association with a commentary, a reflection on the photographic act based on his relationship with the city he lives in: Paris. In 1981, he exhibited Intérieurs at the Centre Pompidou, along with a book published by the Brussels Modern Architecture Archives Editions, which stroke a responsive chord beyond the art world in Human sciences.

In 1983, François Hers had his book of photographs Récit published by Lebeer-Hossmann in Brussels and by Herscher in Paris; it was issued under the title A Tale by the Thames & Hudson editions in London. Its form and content extensively renewed the genre. With a text resulting from dialogues with Jean-François Chevrier and graphic design by Roman Cieslewicz, he presented his thrive to free the modern artist from a situation where he is doomed to remain the lonely hero of his own story. A scenario in which the work itself is locked in the status of object, part of a property or as a traded good, without being able to concretize the ambitions of a generation of artists: change the world and place art within life. A quest that will be qualified as “primitive.”

In 1986, he took part in the exhibition Chambres d’Amis (Guest Rooms) in Ghent, Belgium, for which the organizer Jan Hoet was inspired by his book Interieurs, and after working with a major contemporary art gallery, Gewad, directed by Joost Declerq, François Hers was definitely convinced of the need to go on searching the means to reach his goals elsewhere than in museums, through unprecedented cooperation.

Once more in 1983, in response to a request made by Bernard Latarjet on behalf of the DATAR, (the French Inter-ministerial Delegation for Territorial and Regional Attractiveness), François Hers proposed the creation of a photographic mission for which he conceived the protocol, directing it himself until 1989. He convinced this public structure to endorse its own cultural liability connected to its technical activity, transforming Landscapes in France. Facing such responsibilities then led to partnerships with artists in charge of setting up new ways to connect with contemporary spaces. The DATAR Photographic Mission was a historic moment in photography and representations in space.

In 1990, consulted by the Fondation de France and then new director Bernard Latarget, who were looking for models of action which would allow for a better understanding of the real cultural needs of our society, François Hers proposed a mode of action based on a call for art coming from society itself. An action controlled by a protocol brought into reality in 1991 by the Fondation, establishing a link with a multiform support programme for research in art history and human sciences. The implementation of the Protocol of the New Patrons was helped by personalities from the contemporary art world, named "mediators" by François Hers, whose goal is to use their knowledge and competence to create a bond, not only between existing works and the general public, but also between people, to create an artwork together: a patron, an artist, and above all those concerned by the work of art.

In 2001, François Hers had the Presses du Réel publish Le Protocole in Dijon. This first manifest text was then translated into the languages of the many people involved in the process launched. In line with this book, the same editor published in 2012 L'Art sans le capitalisme, with Xavier Douroux. Two works in particular will enrich the critical acclaim of the New Patrons' actions. In 2013, under the direction of Bruno Latour, Faire art comme on fait société (Make Art as We Make Society) proposed a sum of forty-seven contributions, coming from many different disciplines. This put the action into perspective by basing it either on studies of commissions or case studies throughout history, or on the general study of its present-day operations. In 2017, under the direction of Estelle Zhong and Xavier Douroux, another work will be published in English, Reclaiming Art – Reshaping Democracy, with Anglo-Saxon points of view.

Parallel to his work as a cultural adviser to the Fondation de France, François Hers continues other projects. In 1994, in a confrontational context concerning the validity of Private foundations in culture, he directed the establishment of the Hartung-Bergman Foundation, which has since become a reference. This laboratory evolves around the modes of management and studies on this other essential data of contemporary culture: art heritage. In 2014, he considered that the direction should be passed onto a historian, art history being the foundation's reason for existence. It is now directed by Thomas Schlesser (FR).

While piloting the development of exceptional artistic patrimony of archives in a 17th-century castle, François Hers established several other artists' foundations. For instance, the Olivier Messiaen Foundation, which has become, after renovations on the property where he composed most of his works, in 2016, a privileged residency for other composers and musicians. He offered the artistic direction to Bruno Messina (EN).

Elsewhere, in a botanical and animal park, also under the aegis of the Fondation de France, he proposed to call on the Architects Patrick Bouchain (FR) and Loïc Julienne, with their teams of landscapers and Graphic designers, to bring shape to the cultural dimensions of this place. He also called on researchers to conceive responses that could be applied to one of the principle questions posed by this place and to which our society is hereby confronted: how may one move from a predatory to a diplomatic relationship with the living and the land?

In parallel, by organizing Seminars and supporting Publications with the Fondation de France, many works now present, from antiquity till the present day, a history of art that is not only about form, but also about the political conditions and contexts which brought artists to react and which determined the status society granted to their works.

In 2016, François Hers published, in French and in English, Letter to a Friend About the New Patrons in order to accompany the action's national and international development. Several private and public, French and foreign, especially German, institutions have since been associated with the adventure.

In 2017, as part of a new editorial project called L'Art de la réponse, he proposed that the call for philosophy and research in Human sciences be extended to the ensemble of the cultural challenges and societal questions the Fondation de France is confronted with, along with the very many actors it supports, in order to provide significant answers.

The Protocol of New Patrons 

In his Letter to a Friend, François Hers proposes to open a new chapter in art history. Indeed, he considers that the conditions have been brought together for the writing of a chapter that could be called an art of Democracy, following the one called Modern art.

In this new chapter, the point now is to give a satisfying meaning to the results of the conquest of modernity that started in the Renaissance and finished in the Sixties. A long period when artists assumed a decisive social role because the principle motor of creation was, according to Hers, the invention of Individuality and emancipation in all the modes of perception of the world and all forms of personal expression.

After these founding conquests that led to the invention of democracy and the development of science and technology, it is important to develop a creative movement as strong as those left to us by history in which we may live a great common cultural policy, no longer as just artists of different forms of power, be they religious, political or financial.

In other words, in democracy, this new chapter may only be written by society itself in the frame of a dialogue with its artists. Dialogue made possible thanks to the completion of the liberation of form, in all creative disciplines achieved by artists, and which hereby allows them, in their infinite diversity, to take all the cultural issues of their era into consideration. Issues which Hers proposes that each person expresses, as an actor, on a stage of art beyond its walls, because this stage is the stage of the invention of form and best fit to invent satisfying relationships between singular individuals: speech is freer, one is master of ones acts and thoughts are translated in acts. The call for art is also what allows a common artwork to go beyond the personal interests that gave birth to it, to become the expression of a question of general interest.

To act on this stage, the New Patrons’ Protocol defines the roles and the responsibilities of all the social actors, whoever they may be and wherever they live and work: citizens must be those who express the need for art and an investment in creation by publicly assuming the responsibility of a commission, artists create the appropriate work, with all the creative disciplines at their disposal, the elected politicians and the patrons, along with their respective administrations, contribute to the inclusion of the initiative, helped by the competence of the cultural mediators, actors who play a key role in bringing all these actors together for the production of a finalized artwork, and Philosophers and Researchers in Social sciences enlighten the challenges and put the action into perspective.

After an intermission of fifty years, during which art was called contemporary, art becomes, once more, a motor of History.

Bibliography 
 Intérieurs, with Sophie Ristelhueber, Archives d'Architecture Moderne, 1981, 
 Récit, Lebeer-Hossmann and Herscher, 1983, 
 A Tale, Thames & Hudson, 1983, 
 Paysages Photographies, La Mission Photographique de la Datar, Travaux en cours, Hazan, 1985, 
 Paysages Photographies, En France des années quatre-vingt, Hazan, 1989, 
 Le Protocole, Les Presses du Réel, 2002, 
 L'Art sans le capitalisme, Les presses du réel, 2012, 
 Art Without Capitalism, Les presses du réel, 2013, 
 Faire Art comme on fait société, Les presses du réel, 2013, 
 Reclaiming Art – Reshaping Democracy, Les presses du réel, 2017
 Letter to a Friend About the New Patrons, Les presses du réel, 
 Lettre à un ami au sujet des Nouveaux commanditaires, Les presses du réel,

Honours 
 1983: Nadar Prize
 1999: Juan Miro UNESCO Medal
 2009: Chevalier des Arts et Lettres
 2016: Chevalier de la Légion d'Honneur

Notes and references 

1943 births
Living people
Photographers from Brussels
People from Uccle